William A. Jayne (October 8, 1826March 20, 1916) was an American politician and physician. He served as Governor of the Dakota Territory and as the territory's delegate to the United States House of Representatives during the American Civil War.

Jayne was born in Springfield, Illinois.  He attended Illinois College in 1844 where he was a founding member and served as first president of Phi Alpha Literary Society.  He formed part of the three-man committee that prepared the society's constitution. He graduated in medicine from the University of Missouri in 1849.  He began his practice in Springfield and served as Abraham Lincoln's personal physician. He became mayor of Springfield in 1859, and then a member of the State Senate in 1860, but resigned in 1861 to accept the appointment by President Lincoln to be the first Governor of Dakota Territory.  He served from May 27, 1861, until 1863, then as a Delegate to the House of Representatives from March 4, 1863, to June 17, 1864.

Jayne then returned to Springfield and continued the practice of medicine.  He was appointed U.S. Pension Agent in 1869 for four years and served three terms as mayor of Springfield beginning in 1876. He also served as Director and Vice President of the First National Bank of Springfield. He resumed the practice of medicine in 1873.

Jayne married Julia Witherbee in 1850 and had six children with her. He died in Springfield and is interred in Oak Ridge Cemetery in Springfield.

References

External links

|-

1826 births
1916 deaths
19th-century American politicians
Burials at Oak Ridge Cemetery
Governors of Dakota Territory
Delegates to the United States House of Representatives from Dakota Territory
Illinois College alumni
Republican Party Illinois state senators
Mayors of Springfield, Illinois
North Dakota Republicans
People of Illinois in the American Civil War
People of North Dakota in the American Civil War
Physicians from Illinois
University of Missouri alumni